Abu 'Abd Allah Muhammad ibn Ishaq ibn al-'Abbas al-Fakihi (born 215–220 AH; died 272-279 AH) was an eminent 9th-century historian and hadith scholar of Mecca. He narrated hadiths from preeminent hadith scholars such as Muhammad Ibn Ismail al-Bukhari, Muslim ibn al-Hajjaj, Abu Hatim al-Razi and Abu Zur'ah Jurjani.

Works 
 Akhbār Makkah fī qadīm al-dahr wa-ḥadīthih (أخبار مكة في قديم الدهر وحديثه): The book, of which only the second half survived to the present day, was praised by Ibn Hajar and Taqi al-Din al-Fasi. A small portion of the work was edited by Ferdinand Wüstenfeld.

References 

9th-century Arabs
Hadith scholars
Sunni imams
Sunni Muslim scholars of Islam